Hana Birnerová (born 27 June 1989) is a Czech former tennis player.

Birnerová won two doubles titles on the ITF Women's Circuit in her career. On 12 February 2007, she reached her best doubles ranking of world No. 177.

ITF Circuit finals

Doubles: 10 (2–8)

References

External links
 
 

1989 births
Living people
Sportspeople from Plzeň
Czech female tennis players